The Amyclinae are a subfamily of planthoppers in the Auchenorrhyncha, whose Basionym was first used by Zeno Payne Metcalf in 1938.  The recorded distribution is the Americas, Africa, Malesia and Australia.

Genera 
The subfamily contains a single tribe – the Amyclini – which currently (2022) contains 18 species in the following genera:
 Alcathous Stål, 1863
 Amycle Stål, 1861
 Druentia Stål, 1866
 Pseudoamycle Campodonico & Fierro, 2019
 Rhabdocephala Van Duzee, 1929
 Samsama Distant, 1906  (Peninsular Malaysia, Sumatra: 1 sp. S. chersonesia)
 Scolopsella Ball, 1905
incertae sedis
 Antsalovasia Constant, 2004

References

External links 
 
 

Hemiptera subfamilies
Hemiptera of Africa
Hemiptera of Asia
Hemiptera of South America
Fulgoridae